Jack Farthing (born 14 October 1985) is a British actor.

Early life
Born and raised in North London, Farthing attended two independent schools; the Hall School, Hampstead and Westminster School in central London. He read History of Art at St Catherine's College, Oxford, before attending London Academy of Music and Dramatic Art.

Acting career 
He is notable for playing Freddie Threepwood in Blandings (2013–2014) and villain George Warleggan in the BBC One drama series Poldark (2015–2019). He also appeared as George Balfour in The Riot Club (2014), Marc Fisher in the Netflix romantic comedy Love Wedding Repeat (2020) and Charles, Prince of Wales in the drama Spencer (2021).

Filmography

Film

Television

References

External links
 
 Jack Farthing at the British Film Institute

People from London
1985 births
Living people
People educated at The Hall School, Hampstead
People educated at Westminster School, London
Alumni of St Catherine's College, Oxford
Alumni of the London Academy of Music and Dramatic Art
English male film actors
English male television actors
British film actors
British male film actors
British television actors